This is a list of films about the Romanian Revolution.

Fiction
Sindromul Timişoara - Manipularea, 2004, 
Cincisprezece, 2005, 
East of Bucharest, 2006 
The Paper Will Be Blue, 2006 
The Way I Spent the End of the World, 2006

Non-fiction
A Lesson in Dying, date unknown
A Day in Bucharest, date unknown
Let There Be Peace in this House, date unknown
Requiem für Dominik, 1990 
Dateline: 1989, Romania, 1991
Videogramme einer Revolution, 1992 
Dracula's Shadow - The Real Story Behind the Romanian Revolution, 2009. EurOnAir Productions Ltd. Co-production with DUNA TV.
Stremt 89, 2011

References
Multinational Documentaries on Eastern Europe, at the Russian and East European Institute (Indiana University)

Romanian Revolution
Romanian Revolution
Films